Timothy Neal Christopher Ireland is a former professional baseball player. He played parts of two seasons in Major League Baseball for the Kansas City Royals, appearing in 11 games in 1981 and 1982. He has also managed 12 seasons at various levels of the minor leagues.

Ireland was originally selected in the 25th round of the 1973 Major League Baseball draft by the Montreal Expos. He was released by Montreal in April 1975, and over the next four seasons was under contract to five different organizations, ending up with the Royals in May 1977. He spent four more seasons with the Royals organization before making it to the majors in 1981, when he played four games at first base without coming to bat. He did score one run that season as a pinch runner. In 1982 he played in 7 additional games, including a pair of starts in right field, going 1-for-7 at the plate. In December, he was released. He then played two seasons for the Hiroshima Toyo Carp in Japan, and for the Fort Myers Sun Sox in the Senior Professional Baseball Association in 1989.

After his playing career, he managed the Salinas Spurs in the California League in 1989. He then managed from 1992 until 1997 in the Milwaukee Brewers farm system, winning league titles with the Stockton Ports in the California League in 1992 and with the El Paso Diablos in the Texas League in 1994.

He spent the next three seasons as a scout for the Colorado Rockies, mostly in the Pacific Rim, signing Chin-hui Tsao among other players. In 2001, he returned to minor league managing with the independent Sonoma County Crushers. The following season, he was hired by the Texas Rangers, and managed in their system until 2004, when he won another league title with the Frisco RoughRiders of the Texas League.

In 2005, the Rangers made Ireland their minor league baserunning coordinator. In 2006, he started the season as manager of the Oklahoma RedHawks, but was replaced after 33 games by Mike Boulanger.

Sources
, or Retrosheet, or Pura Pelota (Venezuelan winter league)

1953 births
Living people
American expatriate baseball people in Taiwan
American expatriate baseball players in Canada
American expatriate baseball players in Japan
Baseball players from Oakland, California
Chabot College alumni
Chabot Gladiators baseball players
Colorado Rockies scouts
Fort Myers Sun Sox players
Hiroshima Toyo Carp players
Jacksonville Suns players
Jamestown Expos players
Kansas City Royals players
Major League Baseball first basemen
Major League Baseball second basemen
Major League Baseball third basemen
Major League Baseball right fielders
Miami Marlins (FSL) players
Miami Orioles players
Minor league baseball managers
Nippon Professional Baseball second basemen
Nippon Professional Baseball shortstops
Nippon Professional Baseball third basemen
Omaha Royals players
Pompano Beach Cubs players
Québec Carnavals players
Tiburones de La Guaira players
American expatriate baseball players in Venezuela
Trois-Rivières Aigles players
Vancouver Canadians players
West Palm Beach Expos players